Lars Are Nedland (born 13 May 1976), known also as Lazare, from Kristiansand, Norway, is the vocalist, drummer, and keyboardist for acclaimed avant-garde black metal band Solefald. He is also keyboardist for the heavy metal act Borknagar. He composes much of the music and all the arrangements for violin and cello on the Solefald albums, Red for Fire: An Icelandic Odyssey Part 1 and Black For Death: An Icelandic Odyssey Part 2. He also has written some lyrics for the band, including the songs "04.34 pm", "Fluorescent", and "White Frost Queen." He and vocalist/guitarist/bassist/main lyricist Cornelius Jakhelln started Solefald in August 1995.

Career

Over the years Lazare has joined a variety of bands, playing drums on the black metal band Carpathian Forest's 1998 album, Black Shining Leather, joining progressive metal band Borknagar to play piano, keyboard, synthesizer and Hammond organ, sing back-up vocals, and write lyrics, in 2000, and arranging sessions on drums for other bands (Böh, Grail, God.com)

In 2003 he joined folk/Viking metal band, Ásmegin, in which he sings all clean male vocals. In 2004, he was asked to join the avant-garde metal band Age of Silence as singer and main lyricist, which includes members such as Andy Winter from the band Winds, and Hellhammer from bands such as Arcturus, Mayhem, Winds.

Lazare is also a researcher/reporter/proprietor for the Norwegian television station TVNORGE, where he books guests, puts up cases, and goes out to report.

Interviews
 Interview With Solefald
 Interview With Solefald 2

Discography

With Solefald 

 Jernlov (demo) (1996)
 The Linear Scaffold (1997)
 Neonism (1999)
 Pills Against The Ageless Ills (2001)
 In Harmonia Universali (2003)
 Red For Fire: An Icelandic Odyssey Part 1 (2005)
 Black For Death: An Icelandic Odyssey Part 2 (2006)
 The Circular Drain (2008)
 Norrøn Livskunst (2010)
 World Metal. Kosmopolis Sud (2015)

With Borknagar 

  Quintessence (2000)
  Empiricism (2001)
  Epic (2004)
  Origin (2006)
  For the Elements (2008)
  Universal (2010)
  Urd (2012)
  Winter Thrice (2016)
  True North  (2019)

With Age of Silence 

 Acceleration (2004)
 Complication - Trilogy of Intricacy (2005)

With Ásmegin 
 Hin Vordende Sod & Sø (2003)

With Böh 
  Böh (2001)

With White Void 
 Anti (2021)

As session musician/guest musician 
 Carpathian Forest – Black Shining Leather (drums) (1998)
 Vintersorg – Visions From The Spiral Generator (Hammond organ) (2002)
 Vintersorg – The Focusing Blur (Hammond Organ, vocals/spoken word, lyrics) (2004)
 Sturmgeist – Meister Mephisto (backing-vocals) (2005)
 Winds – Prominence and Demise (vocals) (2007)
 Pantheon I – The Wanderer and His Shadow (vocals) (2007)
 Havoc Unit – h.IV+ (vocals) (2008)
 Rotting Christ - Holy Mountain (vocals) (2022)

References

External links
Official Lars Nedland Myspace Page
Solefald.org
Borknagar.com
Ageofsilence.com
Asmegin.com
Sturmgeist.com
Vintersorganic.com

1976 births
Living people
Heavy metal keyboardists
Norwegian heavy metal singers
Norwegian black metal musicians
Norwegian heavy metal drummers
Male drummers
Norwegian multi-instrumentalists
Norwegian rock keyboardists
Norwegian rock singers
Musicians from Kristiansand
Carpathian Forest members
Borknagar members
21st-century Norwegian singers
21st-century Norwegian drummers
21st-century Norwegian male singers